Kentropyx altamazonica, also known commonly as the Cocha whiptail, is a species of lizard in the family Teiidae. The species is native to South America.

Geographic range
K. altamazonica is found in Bolivia, Brazil, Colombia, Ecuador, Peru, and Venezuela.

Habitat
The preferred natural habitat of K. altamazonica is forest.

Reproduction
K. altamazonica is oviparous.

References

Further reading
Cope ED (1875). "Report on the Reptiles brought by Professor James Orton from the middle and upper Amazon, and western Peru". Journal of the Academy of Natural Sciences of Philadelphia, Second Series 8: 159–183. (Centropyx altamazonicus, new species, pp. 162–163).

altamazonica
Reptiles described in 1875
Taxa named by Edward Drinker Cope